Engelskirchen (literally "angel’s churches") is a municipality in Oberbergischer Kreis, Germany in North Rhine-Westphalia, about  east of Cologne. The neighbouring municipalities are (clockwise from the west) Overath, Lindlar, Gummersbach, Wiehl and Much.

History
Engelskirchen is an old Bergisches Land settlement mentioned for the first time in 1353 as Engellerskerken. On 1 January 1975, the independent municipalities of Engelskirchen and Ründeroth, formally known as 'Runde Rode' were combined to form the modern-day Engelskirchen.

Coat of arms of Engelskirchen
The coat of arms, granted on 24 March 1976, contains the lion of the Counts of Berg and the chequered bar of the arms of the Counts of the Mark. Historically the municipality was part of both counties.

Subdivision
The municipality Engelskirchen consists of the following settlements: Albertsthal, Bellingroth, Bickenbach, Blumenau, Büscherhof, Büscherhöfchen, Buschhausen, Daxborn, Distelhaus, Dörrenberg, Dumpe, Ehreshoven, Engelskirchen, Erlenhof, Feckelsberg, Forkscheid, Grünscheid, Hahn, Hardt, Haus Ley, Haus Selbach, Heide, Hintersteimel, Hülsen, Hollenberg, Kaltenbach, Kastor, Lepperhammer, Loope, Lüdenbach, Madonna, Meisenbüchel, Miebach, Müllensiefen, Neuenhaus, Neuhardt, Neuremscheid, Niederhof, Oberbüchel, Oberhollenberg, Oberstaat, Obersteeg, Oesinghausen, Ötterstal, Ohl, Osberghausen, Papiermühle, Perdt, Remerscheid, Rennbruch, Rommersberg, Rosenau, Rottland, Ründeroth, Schiffarth, Schnellenbach, Staadt, Steeg, Stiefelhagen, Stürzenberg, Thal, Unterbüchel, Unterhollenberg, Unterkaltenbach, Unterschelmerath, Unterstaat, Vordersteimel, Wahlscheid, Walbach, Wallefeld, Werthsiefen, Westen and Wiehlmünden.

Sites of interest

Museums
 Baumwollspinnerei Ermen & Engels, one of six locations of the Rheinisches Industriemuseum
 Oelchenshammer, a museum forge

Castles and castles
 Ehreshoven Castle
 Water castle Alsbach

Monuments
The old warrior's monument with thing site. 
 The grave yard next to the St. Peter and Pauls church with crosses and a small chapel is the modern Memorial for war victims.
The Lohmühle and three other mills in the Lambachtal
Aggertal cave in Ründeroth

Catholic parish church of Saints Peter and Paul
The origin of the parish church with the name Saints Peter and Paul in Engelskirchen lies in the 13th century. The massive west tower dates back to this time. It became an independent parish following its separation from Saint Severinus parish in Lindlar in 1554. The number of parishioners outgrew the capacity of the church in the 19th century. Then a new three-aisle long house on round pillars with transepts and separate main choir was established. From 1943 to 1945 homeless inhabitants of Cologne and foreign civilian prisoners were housed here. Nonetheless, an air raid on the last day of the war resulted in two bombs destroying part of the church. The bombs hit the aisle and tower, and the vault collapsed. Three years later, a minimal renovation was done. In the 1970s, there was a more thorough renovation.  Later a new sacristy was built.

Christmas post office
Each year from November 15 until December 22, the post office of Engelskirchen (whose name literally means "angel's churches") answers letters to the Christkind (Christ Child).  In 2009, over 160,000 letters arrived from all over the world.

Twin towns
 Plan-de-Cuques, France, since 1972
 Mogilno, Poland, since 2012

Literature
 Josef Hesse - Engelskirchen im 19. und 20. Jahrunderte (Engelskirchen in the 19th and the 20th Centuries), Engelskirchen 1985
 Peter Opladen and Edmund Schiefeling, Engelskirchen im Aggertal 1051

References

External links
  
 Information about Engelskirchen 

Oberbergischer Kreis
Districts of the Rhine Province